Wang Xiaoni (born 1955) is a Chinese poet.

Xiaoni graduated from Jilin University in 1982 where she was a literary editor and worked for a film studio. In 1985, she settled in Shenzhen and became a professor at Hainan University. She has published over 25 books of poetry and won several awards. In 2015 the translation of her book Something Crosses My Mind by Eleanor Goodman was shortlisted for the International Griffin Poetry Prize. Other translations of her work have been published by poet Pascale Petit.

Published works 

 My Selected Poems (1986)
 On Visiting Friends (1992-1993)
 Exile in Shenzhen (1994)
 My Paper Wraps My Fire (1997)
 Something Crosses My Mind (2014)

References

External links 
  Poetry International Web
 http://www.pen.org/poetry/selected-poems-wang-xiaoni
 http://www.scmp.com/lifestyle/books/article/1585822/poetry-review-something-crosses-my-mind-wang-xiaoni
 Paper Republic
 School of Chinese - The University of Hong Kong Website

Living people
1955 births
Modern Chinese poetry
Poets from Jilin
People's Republic of China poets
Chinese women short story writers
21st-century Chinese short story writers
21st-century Chinese women writers
People's Republic of China short story writers
Short story writers from Jilin
Writers from Changchun